Usha Sanyal is an American scholar and historian. Her PhD dissertation analysed the Islamic legal scholar Ahmed Raza Khan Barelvi. She is Visiting assistant professor of history at Wingate University in North Carolina.

Education
Sanyal has graduated with a BA (Honors) in Sociology, minor in Economics from Delhi University, India and MA in Southeast Asian Studies, University of Kent at Canterbury, UK. Her M Phil. in History, was done from Columbia University, South Asia and Southeast Asia. She also completed a Ph.D. in history from Columbia University in 1990.

Languages
Sanyal's research includes a knowledge of the English, French, and Hindi/Urdu Languages.

Works 
Sanyal has authored five books:

 Scholars of Faith: South Asian Muslim Women and the Embodiment of Religious Knowledge, Oxford University Press.
 Food, Faith and Gender in South Asia: The Cultural Politics of Women's Food Practices (Criminal Practice Series), editor, with Nita Kumar, 2020 Bloomsbury Academic (February 20, 2020).
 Muslim Voices: Community and Self in South Asia (New Perspectives on Indian Pasts) with David Gilmartin, and Sandria Freitag, eds. Delhi: Yoda Press, 2013.
 Devotional Islam and Politics in British India: Ahmed Raza Khan Barelwi and His Movement, 1870-1920. 1st & 2nd editions. New York and Delhi: Oxford University Press, 1999. 3rd edition. Delhi:Yoda Press, 2010 (Urdu Translation in 2013)
 Ahmed Raza Khan: In the Path of the Prophet. Oxford: Oneworld Publications. 2005
Devotional Islam and Politics in British India received a positive review from the scholar and translator of South Asian literature Aditya Behl in The Journal of Religion. He described it as "a well-researched and welcome addition to the literature on Islamic reform in colonial India".

Her articles include:

“South Asian Islamic Education in the Pre-Colonial, Colonial, and Postcolonial Periods” In Global Education Systems. Handbook of Education Systems in South Asia, eds. Padma M. Sarangapani and Rekha Pappu (Forthcoming, Springer Nature India)
“Sufism through the Prism of Shari‘a: A Reformist Barelwi Girls’ Madrasa in Uttar Pradesh, India” In Katherine P. Ewing and Rosemary Corbett, eds., Modern Sufis and the State: Rethinking Islam and Politics in South Asia and Beyond (Columbia University Press, forthcoming).
“Discipline and Nurture: Living in a Girls’ Madrasa, Living in Community,”  co-authored with Sumbul Farah, in Modern Asian Studies (2018)
“Al-Huda International: How Muslim Women Empower Themselves through Online Study of the Qur’an,” in Hawwa: Journal of Women of the Middle East and the Islamic World (2015) 13(3): 449–460.
“Changing Concepts of the Person in Two Ahl-e Sunnat/Barelwi Texts for Women: The Sunni Bihishti Zewar and Jannati Zewar,  in Usha Sanyal, David Gilmartin, and Sandria Freitag, eds., Muslim Voices: Community and the Self in South Asia, eds. Usha Sanyal, David Gilmartin,  and Sandria Freitag (New Delhi: Yoda Press. 2013)
“Barelwis.” In The Encyclopaedia of Islam, 3rd ed., pp. 94–99. Leiden: E. J. Brill, 2011.
“Sufi Ritual Practice among the Barkatiyya Sayyids of U.P.: Nuri Miyan’s Life and Urs, Late Nineteenth – Early Twentieth Centuries.” In Barbara D. Metcalf, ed., Islam in South Asia in Practice. Series ed. Donald S. Lopez, Jr. Princeton University Press, 2009.
“Ahl-i Sunnat Madrasas: The Madrasa Manzar-i Islam, Bareilly, and Jamia Ashrafiyya, Mubarakpur.” In Jamal Malik ed., Madrasas in South Asia. Routledge, 2008.
“Ahmad Riza Khan Barelwi.” Encyclopedia of Islam, 3rd edition. Leiden: E. J. Brill, 2007.
“Tourists, Pilgrims and Saints:The Shrine of Mu`in al-Din Chishti of Ajmer” In Carol Henderson and Maxine Weisgrau, eds., Raj Rhapsodies: Tourism, Heritage and the Seduction of History. Ashgate Publishing Ltd., U.K., 2007.
“Barelwis.” In Jane D. McAuliffe, ed., Encyclopedia of the Quran, vol. 1, pp. 201–203. Leiden:E. J. Brill, 2002.
“The [Re-]Construction of South Asian Muslim Identity in Queens, New York.” In Carla Petievich, ed., The Expanding Landscape: South Asians and the Diaspora, pp. 141–152. New Delhi: Manohar, 1999.
“Generational Changes in the Leadership of the Ahl-e Sunnat Movement in North India during the Twentieth Century.” Modern Asian Studies 32, 3 (1998): 635–656.
“Are Wahhabis Kafirs? Ahmad Riza Khan Barelwi and His Sword of the Haramayn.” In Muhammad Khalid Masud, Brinkley Messick, and David S. Powers, eds., Islamic Legal Interpretation: Muftis and Their Fatwas, pp. 204–213. Cambridge, Mass.: Harvard University Press, 1996.
“Barelwis.” In John L. Esposito, ed., The Oxford Encyclopedia of the Modern Islamic World, vol. 1, pp. 200–203. New York: Oxford University Press, 1995.
“Pir, Shaikh, and Prophet: The Personalization of Religious Authority in Ahmad Riza Khan’s Life.” In Contributions to Indian Sociology 28, 1 (1994): 35–66. (Also published in T. N. Madan, ed., Muslim Communities of South Asia: Culture, Society, and Power, pp. 405–428. New Delhi: Manohar, 1995.)

References

External links 
 http://www.ushasanyal.org
https://www.historians.org/publications-and-directories/perspectives-on-history/may-2017/aha-member-spotlight-usha-sanyal

American historians of religion
Historians of South Asia
Living people
Columbia University alumni
Year of birth missing (living people)
Delhi University alumni
Ahmed Raza Khan Barelvi
Historians of India